Frøydis Armand (9 April 1949 – 11 October 2022) was a Norwegian actress. She was the daughter of actor Eilif Armand, and sister of Merete Armand and Gisken Armand, both actresses. She worked at Nationaltheatret (the National Theatre) from 1972 onward, acting in plays such as Henrik Ibsen's Little Eyolf, and Shakespeares Othello. Though primarily a stage actress, Armand was probably best known to the general audience as one of the three protagonists in Anja Breien's Hustruer–trilogy: Hustruer (1975), Hustruer – ti år etter (1985) and Hustruer III (1996).

Armand had a child from a marriage to actor Helge Jordal, and another child from a relationship with actor Kai Remlow. She died on 10 October 2022, at the age of 73.

Select filmography
 1974: Mors hus
 1975: Hustruer
 1980: Nedtur
 1985: Hustruer - ti år etter
 1989: Bryllupsfesten
 1996: Hustruer III
 1999: Sejer - se deg ikke tilbake (TV)
 2000: Aberdeen
 2002: Jul på Månetoppen
 2007: Berlinerpoplene (TV)
 2009: Hotel Cæsar (TV)

References

External links

1949 births
2022 deaths
20th-century Norwegian actresses
21st-century Norwegian actresses
Norwegian film actresses
Norwegian stage actresses
Norwegian television actresses